Saint John Vianney Theological Seminary is a Catholic seminary in Denver, Colorado, dedicated to Saint John Vianney, the patron saint of parish priests. It is located at 1300 South Steele Street in the Cory-Merrill neighborhood of Denver, on the campus of the St. John Paul II Center for the New Evangelization.  Founded in 1999,  St. John Vianney is run by the Archdiocese of Denver.

St. John Vianney offers formation programs for seminarians studying for the priesthood, candidates to become permanent deacons, and lay people interested in learning more about Catholicism.

History
St. John Vianney Theological Seminary was constituted on March 17, 1999.  It replaced the former St. Thomas Seminary, which operated from 1907 to the early 1990's.   Cardinal James Stafford, archbishop of Denver, purchased the St. Thomas Seminary campus from the Congregation of the Mission in 1995. He renamed it the St. John Paul II Center for the New Evangelization and remodeled a facility there for the  archdiocesan chancery.

Archbishop Charles J. Chaput, Stafford's successor. commissioned a feasibility study on establishing a new seminary at the St. John Paul II Center. After consulting with priests and parishioners, he formulated a plan to create  the St. John Vianney Theological Seminary.  The plans also called for the establishment of:

 The St. Francis School of Theology for Deacons
 The Catechetical School
 The Denver Catholic Biblical School for lay formation

Seminarian program

Summary 
The St. John Vianney program for seminarians studying for the priesthood follows the four pillars listed in Pope John Paul II's Pastores Dabo Vobis: human formation, spiritual formation, pastoral formation and intellectual formation. The seminary has three components in the priestly formation process:

 Spirituality year, a one year program for prayer, discernment, study and community service
 Pre-theology cycle, a two or three year program of coursework in philosophy, languages and introductory courses in theology 
 Theology cycle, a four-year program of coursework in the theological and pastoral disciplines required for ordination

Spirituality Year 
The spirituality year (SY) is a 12 month program of prayer, meditation, limited classroom study, community service and evangelization.  It is a prerequisite for the pre-theology cycle.  SY is marked by a commitment to prayer; seminarians attend three retreats, including a 30-day silent Ignatian retreat. They give up phones, television, computers, and popular media. The seminarians live in a separate community on the seminary grounds and pray, study, work and take recreation together. The men also spend two hours a day studying sacred scripture, catechism, and spiritual classics in the classroom. 

At the end of the SY, the seminarians undertake apostolic assignments outside the seminary.  These assignments include teaching young people, visiting the elderly, and ministering to the sick. In January of their spirituality year, the seminarians are sent out in pairs for one month to live with the poor, serve them and teach them about Catholicism.

Pre-theology cycle 
The pre-theology cycle at St. John Vianney is a two- or three-year set of courses that cover philosophy, introductory theology, and languages. It is a prerequisite for the theology cycle.  The seminarian's diocese can choose between degree and non-degree programs in philosophy to meet the entrance requirements for the theology cycle. The study of philosophy is central to the pre-theology program. St. John Vianney offers three undergraduate philosophy programs:  

 Standard program in pre-theology
 Bachelor of Philosophy (B.Phil.) degree 
 Bachelor of Arts (B.A.) degree with a philosophy major

Theology cycle 
The Theology Cycle at St. John Vianney is a four-year program of study in theological and pastoral disciplines which meet the requirements for priestly formation specified by the United States Conference of Catholic Bishops (USCCB). Each seminarian is enrolled in a graduate level program that enables him to earn both a Bachelor of Sacred Theology degree (S.T.B.) and a Master of Divinity degree (M.Div.) prior to ordination.

Deacon program 
St Francis School of Theology for Deacons, (SFSTD), is a division of St John Vianney Seminary. The SFSTD trains permanent deacons for the Archdiocese of Denver  utilizing the same professors as the seminary.  The men who are ordained to Holy Orders provide service of Liturgy, Word, and Sacrament to the Church of Northern Colorado. Admission to SFSTD is limited to men under the age of 60.

Lay person program 
The Catechetical School and the Denver Catholic Biblical School are divisions of St. John Vianney Seminary for laypeople. 

 The Catechetical School offers small group study, independent study, personal application, and lectures.
 The Denver Catholic Biblical School offers lectures, small-group discussions and weekly coursework on the Bible. The school holds prayer days and retreats, trips to Palestine, Israel, Greece, and Rome, and continuing education for its graduates.

Accreditation & Affiliations
St. John Vianney is accredited by the Association of Theological Schools and is affiliated  with the Pontifical University of Saint Thomas Aquinas in Rome and Regis University in Denver.

Administration
Previous rectors of St. John Vianney include Denver's current archbishop Samuel J. Aquila, Msgr. Michael Glenn, Rev. Scott Traynor. . the rector was Fr. Daniel Leonard.

Students
St. John Vianney serves 15 dioceses in the Western United States and two international dioceses. As of 2014, 136 men from these dioceses were attending the seminary to prepare for the priesthood.

References

External links
St. John Vianney Theological Seminary
Cardinal Stafford Library

Catholic universities and colleges in Colorado
Universities and colleges in Denver
Roman Catholic Archdiocese of Denver
Catholic seminaries in the United States
Educational institutions established in 1999
1999 establishments in Colorado